State Route 72 (SR 72) is a state highway in the U.S. state of California. The route runs along Whittier Boulevard in the Los Angeles area from SR 39 in La Habra to Interstate 605 in Whittier. SR 72 forms part of El Camino Real.

Route description
Route 72 officially begins at State Route 19 in Pico Rivera, but the portion between State Route 19 and Interstate 605 is not maintained by Caltrans. Caltrans maintenance of the highway begins at the junction of I-605 in Whittier. The route follows Whittier Boulevard for its entire length, heading southeast through Whittier as a four-lane arterial street. SR 72 crosses with Los Angeles County Route N8 at Colima Road and ends at the intersection of SR-39 (Beach Boulevard) in La Habra. Whittier Boulevard is a major commercial corridor in Whittier, though it does not go through the city center, which is north of the highway.

The route formerly continued west under a railroad bridge near Pio Pico State Historic Park and then over the San Gabriel River as it entered Pico Rivera and met State Route 19 at Rosemead Boulevard. After about a mile and a half, the route crossed a narrow steel bridge over the Rio Hondo into Montebello. There, it continued towards Atlantic Boulevard. From there, it continued further to its end at Downey Road. Whittier Boulevard itself continues past Downey Road towards downtown Los Angeles. These segments have been relinquished back to the cities of Pico Rivera and Montebello, and are not included in the length of SR 72.

Despite the fact that the route's current alignment primarily goes west along Whittier Boulevard from Beach Boulevard to I-605, SR 72 is defined in the state highway code as a north-south state route. This reflects the original alignment and length of SR 72 before the highway was shortened (see below).

SR 72 is part of the National Highway System, a network of highways that are considered essential to the country's economy, defense, and mobility by the Federal Highway Administration.

History
California's historic El Camino Real, which connected the Alta California missions, ran along what was then U.S. Route 101. Before 1964, U.S. Route 101 continued past today's end near the East Los Angeles Interchange east onto Whittier Boulevard and south on Harbor Boulevard until it met its bypass in Anaheim. (What is now Route 5 from Los Angeles to Anaheim was the U.S. Route 101 Bypass.)

In 1964, the U.S. Route 101 designation was removed south of the East L.A. Interchange. Its routing on Whittier and Harbor Boulevards became Route 72 and was initially defined to run from Route 5 (the former bypass) to an unbuilt State Route 245, hence the route's lackluster end at Downey Road. (Route 245 was to have been a bypass connecting Route 5 with Route 60, a function that was eventually assumed by an extended Route 710.)

In 1965, with Route 245 deleted, the definition was clarified to have Route 72 end at Downey Road, which was parallel to the planned Route 245.

In 1981, the portion from Route 5 to Harbor Boulevard (current Route 39) was deleted, and the portion from Harbor Boulevard to Route 39 was transferred to State Route 39.

In 1992, the portion from Atlantic Boulevard to Downey Road was deleted.

In 2010, SB-1318 Sec. 20 deleted the segment between I-605 and Atlantic Boulevard. It also states that Route 72 will be deleted when "Route 90 freeway is completed from Route 5 to Route 39."

Cal. S&HC § 635(b)
includes unspecified parts of Route 72 in El Camino Real.

Major intersections

See also

References

External links

Caltrans: Route 72 highway conditions
California Highways: Route 72
California @ AARoads.com - State Route 72

072
State Route 072
State Route 072
California State Route 072
La Habra, California
Whittier, California